Derek S.K. Kawakami is an American politician serving as the eleventh Mayor of Kauai since December 3, 2018. Kawakami previously served as a Kauai County Councilmember from 2016-2018 and 2008-2011 and as a member of the Hawaii House of Representatives from April 4, 2011 through November 8, 2016. Kawakami was appointed by Governor Neil Abercrombie to fill the vacancy caused by the appointment of Hermina Morita to chair the Hawaii Public Utilities Commission. Kawakami is a member of the Democratic Party.

Education
Kawakami graduated from Kauaʻi Community College and earned his BA from Chaminade University of Honolulu.

Elections
2012 Kawakami was unopposed for both the August 11, 2012 Democratic Primary, winning with 3,261 votes, and the November 6, 2012 General election.
Elected Kauai Council Member November 8, 2016, coming in first with 15,990 votes.
Elected Mayor of Kauai on November 6, 2018, defeating Mel Rapozo by a count of 16,797 to 7,969.

References

External links
Official page at the Hawaii State Legislature
Campaign site

21st-century American politicians
American politicians of Japanese descent
Place of birth missing (living people)
Year of birth missing (living people)
Chaminade University of Honolulu alumni
Living people
Democratic Party members of the Hawaii House of Representatives
Kauaʻi Community College alumni
Hawaii politicians of Japanese descent
Mayors of Kauai
American mayors of Japanese descent